The Unity Sessions is an album by American jazz guitarist Pat Metheny and his Unity Band: saxophonist Chris Potter, bassist  Ben Williams, keyboardist Giulio Carmassi and drummer Antonio Sánchez. A live album in a studio setting, it was recorded with a camera crew in a black box theatre without an audience. The recording was released on DVD and Blu-Ray disc in 2015, then as a double CD in 2016.

Reception

The album received generally favourable reviews with Metacritic giving it a score of 80% from 4 reviews. The AllMusic review by Matt Collar states "Ultimately, while Metheny is the undisputed leader here, it's the thoughtful interplay of all the Unity Group's members that makes these sessions so involving". In The Observer Dave Gelly wrote, "This double album, recorded at the end of a year-long tour by his Unity Band, is as polished and sophisticated as any, but moments such as the opening melody of "This Belongs to You" or the gradual unfolding of "Born" are just plain elegant". Writing for The Guardian, John Fordham observed, "there's a generally exhilarating sense of freedom here, notably in improv exchanges between the players and with Metheny's one-man-band Orchestrion machine, that testifies to how attuned constant gigging has made them".

Track listing

Personnel
 Pat Metheny – electric and acoustic guitars, guitar synthesizer, electronics, orchestrionics
 Chris Potter – tenor and soprano saxophones, bass clarinet, flute, guitar
 Giulio Carmassi – piano, synthesizer, flugelhorn, whistling, vocals
 Ben Williams – acoustic and electric bass
 Antonio Sánchez – drums, cajón

References

Pat Metheny live albums
2016 live albums
Nonesuch Records live albums